Darryl James Knights (born 1 May 1988) is an English footballer who plays for Stourbridge, where he plays as a striker.

Playing career
Born in Ipswich, Knights was a product of the youth system at Ipswich Town and played for England at youth and Under-17 level. He made his debut for the club as a 16-year-old in November 2004 but did not play for the first team again.  After impressing Yeovil Town manager Russell Slade in training, Knights joined the League One side on loan in February 2007 for the remainder of the 2006–07 season. He made five substitute appearances for Yeovil, including one in the League One play-off final against Blackpool in May 2007.  He then joined the club on a one-year contract in July 2007 after being given a free transfer by Ipswich at the end of the season.

Knights was unable to establish himself in the first team at Yeovil and joined Cambridge United on loan in October 2007. He returned to Yeovil in December 2007  He then joined Kidderminster Harriers on loan the following month for the rest of the 2007–08 season.  After a successful loan spell at Kidderminster in which he scored four goals, he joined the club on a permanent basis in the summer of 2008.

In July 2010, Knights signed for Newport County. He subsequently scored the equaliser in the Welsh derby match between Newport and Wrexham in September 2010.  On 12 May 2012, he played for Newport in the FA Trophy Final at Wembley Stadium which Newport lost 2–0 to York City, coming on as a second-half substitute. Knights was released by Newport the following week at the end of his contract.

Knights joined Conference North side Solihull Moors on 1 August 2012 following his release from Newport.  On 6 December 2016, Knights rejoined Kidderminster Harriers after leaving Solihull Moors.  He remained at the club until the end of the season, making 15 appearances and scoring one goal, before being released.  Knights became the first signing of the 2017–18 season for National League North side Tamworth when he joined on 17 May 2017.

Career statistics

Honours
Ipswich Town
FA Youth Cup: 2004–05

Solihull Moors
Birmingham Senior Cup: 2015–16

References

External links

1988 births
Living people
Sportspeople from Ipswich
English footballers
Ipswich Town F.C. players
Yeovil Town F.C. players
Cambridge United F.C. players
Kidderminster Harriers F.C. players
English Football League players
National League (English football) players
Newport County A.F.C. players
England youth international footballers
Solihull Moors F.C. players
Tamworth F.C. players
Association football forwards
AFC Telford United players